Ximena Carias (born May 7, 1965) is a former synchronized swimmer from the Dominican Republic. She competed in both the women's solo and the women's duet competitions at the 1984 Summer Olympics.

She also competed in the women's duet competition at the Seoul 1988 Summer Olympics, after which she effectively retired. She continued to judge various Pan Am games in her retirement.

References 

Living people
Dominican Republic synchronized swimmers
Olympic synchronized swimmers of the Dominican Republic
Synchronized swimmers at the 1984 Summer Olympics
1965 births